Harry may refer to:

TV shows
Harry (American TV series), a 1987 American comedy series starring Alan Arkin
Harry (British TV series), a 1993 BBC drama that ran for two seasons
Harry (talk show), a 2016 American daytime talk show hosted by Harry Connick Jr.

People and fictional characters
Harry (given name), a list of people and fictional characters with the given name
Harry (surname), a list of people with the surname
Dirty Harry (musician) (born 1982), British rock singer who has also used the stage name Harry
Harry Potter (character), the main protagonist in a Harry Potter fictional series by J. K. Rowling

Other uses
Harry (derogatory term), derogatory term used in Norway
Harry (album), a 1969 album by Harry Nilsson
The tunnel used in the Stalag Luft III escape ("The Great Escape") of World War II
Harry (newspaper), an underground newspaper in Baltimore, Maryland

See also
Harrying (laying waste), may refer to the following historical events:
 Harrying of Buchan, Scotland (1308)
 Harrying of the North, England (1069–70)